"The Power of Christmas" is a single by Dutch three-piece girl group Lisa, Amy & Shelley. The song was released in the Netherlands as a digital download on 5 December 2008 through Dino Music and EMI. The song peaked to number 98 on the Dutch Singles Chart.

Track listing

Chart performance

Weekly charts

Release history

References

2008 songs
2008 singles
O'G3NE songs
Christmas songs